Brussels Airport-Zaventem (formerly Brussels National Airport Station, IATA code: BRU) is a railway station located beneath Brussels Airport in Zaventem, Flemish Brabant, Belgium. The station opened in 1958 on railway line 36C; in 2012, the new line 25N was added. The train services are operated by the National Railway Company of Belgium (NMBS/SNCB).

History

The station was opened in 1958 in the old airport building, mainly for the universal exposition in Brussels. With the opening of a new airport terminal in 1994, the railway station was moved in 1998 to a new location inside the new building. Following the completion of the new Diabolo project, the station was extended in June 2012 to enhance the comfort and passengers experience. The trains arrive and leave from level -2, with ticket desks on level -1. Passengers can go to the different floors in the airport and railway station by using a set of escalators and elevators, a couple of meters away of the platforms.

There is no dedicated car park but Brussels Airport carparks are available a short walk away, without any discount for rail customers.

The railway station connects the airport directly to the main Brussels stations, including the international Brussels-South and centrally-located Brussels-Central stations. The railway stations of Leuven and Mechelen can also be directly reached from the airport. From all these stations, one can easily travel to every city of Belgium; there are direct trains to the cities of Antwerp, Bruges, Ghent, Halle or Mons.

Since December 2014, the Benelux train allows passengers to travel directly to Rotterdam, Amsterdam Airport Schiphol and Amsterdam

After the bomb attacks of 22 March 2016 the station was closed and all trains were either deviated or cancelled until further notice. Shuttle bus services were put in place between Zaventem station and the airport. The airport station itself was undamaged, but it is connected to a part of the airport building that was severely damaged during the attacks.

With the Schuman-Josaphat tunnel entering into service on 4 April 2016, a new connection was established to connect Brussels Airport directly to the stations of the EU quarter—Brussels-Schuman and Brussels-Luxembourg.  This brought the travel time between the Airport and the EU quarter to about 15 minutes. The tunnel was originally scheduled to open on 12 December 2015, but it was delayed due to the Brussels lockdown. When it eventually opened in April 2016, it could not yet be used to its full potential as the airport station remained closed following the Brussels bombings.

Train service to the airport station resumed on 22 April 2016, temporarily using the entrance/exit of the old airport station. On 8 June 2016, service via the regular station resumed.

Train services
The station has direct services to most major Belgian cities, as well as a regular service to the Netherlands. The only major town that does not yet have a direct line to the airport is Liège. Passengers traveling to Liège can connect at Leuven station.

The station is served by the following services:

High speed service: (Thalys) Brussels Airport - Brussels - Paris (summer seasonal)
Intercity services (IC 35) Amsterdam - The Hague - Rotterdam - Roosendaal - Antwerp - Brussels Airport - Brussels
Intercity services (IC 06) Tournai - Ath - Brussels - Brussels Airport
Intercity services (IC 06A) Mons - Brussels - Brussels Airport
Intercity services (IC 08) Antwerpen - Mechelen - Brussels Airport - Leuven (- Hasselt)
Intercity services (IC 17) Brussels Airport - Brussels-Luxembourg - Namur - Dinant
Intercity services (IC 23) Ostend - Bruges - Kortrijk - Zottegem - Brussels - Brussels Airport - Brussels - Ghent (- Bruges)
Intercity services (IC 23A) Bruges - Ghent - Brussels - Brussels Airport (weekdays)
Intercity services (IC 23A) Ghent - Brussels - Brussels Airport (weekends)
Intercity services (IC 27) Brussels Airport - Brussels-Luxembourg - Nivelles - Charleroi
Intercity services (IC 29) De Panne - Ghent - Aalst - Brussels - Brussels Airport - Leuven (- Landen)

See also
 List of railway stations in Belgium

References

External links
 national airport.aspx Brussels National Airport railway station at Belgian Railways website

Brussels-National Airport railway station
Railway stations in Flemish Brabant
Railway stations opened in 1958
Airport railway stations
Zaventem
Brussels Airport
1958 establishments in Belgium
Expo 58